Enemies of Happiness is a 2006 documentary about the controversial Afghan politician and member of the Afghan Parliament Malalai Joya filmed by Danish director Eva Mulvad.

The film team travelled with the then 28 years old Malalai Joya during her campaign for the 2005 Afghan parliamentary election, which was the first democratic election in 30 years in Afghanistan. The film gives deep insight into the living conditions of the Afghan population.

Awards 
 2006, Silver Wolf Award, IDFA, Amsterdam
 2007, World Cinema Jury Prize: Documentary, Sundance Film Festival
 2007, Special Jury Mention, Silverdocs 2007
 2007, Best long documentary, Festival Films De Femmes, High School Jury, Creteil
 2007, International Premier Award, One World Media Awards, London
 2007, Nestor Almendros Prize, Human Rights Watch Film Festival, New York
 2007, Special Mention, One World Film Festival
 2007, Audience Mention Best Documentary, 15 Mostra Internacional de film de dones, Barcelona

References

External links
 
 Enemies of Happiness film distributor's webpage
 Enemies of Happiness at DFI

2006 films
Danish documentary films
2006 documentary films
Documentary films about women in Afghanistan
Documentary films about politics
2005 in Afghanistan
Sundance Film Festival award winners
2000s English-language films